"This Little Wiggy" is the eighteenth episode of the ninth season of the American animated television series The Simpsons. It originally aired on the Fox network in the United States on March 22, 1998. It was written by Dan Greaney and directed by Neil Affleck. The episode sees Ralph Wiggum becoming friends with Bart. Phil Hartman guest stars as recurring character Troy McClure.

Plot
At a science museum the family is visiting, Bart runs into Ralph Wiggum, who is in the process of being pushed into a giant ear by Kearney, Jimbo, Nelson, and Dolph. When Ralph is freed by a museum employee, Marge and Chief Wiggum are there to meet him. Marge observes that Ralph has a vivid imagination and learns that he has no friends to play with; she arranges a play-date for Ralph to spend time with a horrified Bart, who fears that being seen with Ralph will damage his reputation.

During their play-date, Bart and Ralph walk into Ralph's father's closet, consisting of various police utilities and records before Wiggum, initially forbidding them to enter the closet, allows them to play with the items. Bart then sees Wiggum toss aside a police master key capable of opening any door in Springfield. Bart and Ralph thus steal the key and decide to enter several closed stores at night. After encountering Nelson and his gang, the boys go to a condemned penitentiary. When Ralph objects because he is afraid, the bullies leave, but not before tossing the key into the penitentiary. Ralph and Bart enter the prison to retrieve the key, and in the process stumble onto a room housing an old electric chair. After testing out the chair, the two flee when an elderly guard approaches.

At the Simpsons' home, Bart and Ralph discover that the penitentiary will once again be used by the town, and remember that they forgot to disable the power. Unaware that the power is now active, Mayor Quimby straps himself into the electric chair in a publicity attempt. After failing to call the penitentiary, Ralph then tells Bart that Lisa can probably figure out a way to warn the Mayor. She decides to launch a model rocket with a warning message attached and aims it toward the penitentiary. However, the rocket is blown off-course and crashes through Mr. Burns' office window. As Quimby is getting electrocuted by the chair, Mr. Burns reads the note and disables the penitentiary's power, barely saving Quimby from getting killed. In the aftermath, the Simpsons, including Lisa, whom after Bart points out that Ralph deserves some credit, congratulate Ralph, for pointing out that Lisa could solve the problem, despite Lisa objecting.

Production
Show runner Mike Scully had pitched an idea to Dan Greaney on Marge forcing Bart to become Ralph Wiggum's friend. Scully gave the idea to Greaney due to his ability to write Ralph's lines and actions well, and his overall liking of the character.

This episode was the second to focus on Ralph, after the fourth-season episode "I Love Lisa". Despite this, in 2007, producer J. Stewart Burns did not believe Ralph had an episode with a plot centered on him.

The robot that was introduced early in the episode was influenced by Greaney's experiences working with a USA Today themed robot. While at a baseball game with the robot, the robot led the stadium in singing "Take Me Out to the Ball Game". The robot was not well-received, and the spectators threw objects at it. The robot's operator had to stay close to the robot during the baseball game, and was also teased and bothered in the same way as the operator in the episode.

Episode director Neil Affleck was praised by the staff for his directing in this episode. In the scene where Chief Wiggum falls on his back in his bedroom, unable to roll over or get back up, Affleck decided to act out the scene for the staff to showcase how Affleck envisioned Chief Wiggum's predicament. Affleck was also praised for his ability to create three new elaborate settings in the episode: the science museum, the Springfield penitentiary, and the large toy store.

The episode originally did not involve Lisa helping Ralph and Bart to brainstorm an idea to alert the penitentiary. The original scene, which Greaney cites as one of his favorite scenes in the show, despite never actually being in the show, involved Bart, Ralph, and Homer trying to make a plan to save Mayor Quimby.

Reception
In its original broadcast, "This Little Wiggy" finished 27th in ratings for the week of March 16–22, 1998, with a Nielsen rating of 9.1, equivalent to approximately 8.9 million viewing households. It was the second highest-rated show on the Fox network that week, following Ally McBeal.

The authors of the book I Can't Believe It's a Bigger and Better Updated Unofficial Simpsons Guide, Warren Martyn and Adrian Wood, enjoyed the episode, remarking: "Marvellous fun as Bart comes to realize there's more to Ralph, or at least his daddy, than he realised."

References

External links

 
 

The Simpsons (season 9) episodes
1998 American television episodes
Leprechauns in popular culture
Television episodes about bullying